The Women's double FITA round integrated was an archery competition at the 1984 Summer Paralympics.

The German archer Anneliese Dersen won the gold medal.

Results

References

1984 Summer Paralympics events